Alexander Joseph “AJ” Francois (born 29 April 2003) is an American-born Dominican footballer who plays as a left back for USL Championship club Austin Bold FC and the Dominican Republic national team.

Youth career
In 2012, Francois began playing with USSDA side Lonestar Soccer Club, where he played for eight years. He captained the Lonestar U19 ECNL South team as well as playing with the Soccer Academy at St. Stephen's Episcopal School.

Club career
On 22 September 2020, Francois signed an academy contract, which keeps his college eligibility, with USL Championship side Austin Bold. The following day he made his debut, appearing as an 83rd-minute substitute during a 4–0 win over Sporting Kansas City II.

International career
Francois' maternal grandparents are Dominican. He made his senior international debut for the Dominican Republic on 19 January 2021.

References

External links
 Austin Bold profile

2003 births
Living people
Citizens of the Dominican Republic through descent
Dominican Republic footballers
Association football fullbacks
Dominican Republic international footballers
Soccer players from Austin, Texas
American soccer players
Austin Bold FC players
USL Championship players
American sportspeople of Dominican Republic descent